"Lord willing" is a traditional English phrase related to a verse in the Epistle of James:

Lord Willing may also refer to:

Lord Willin', album by Virginia hip-hop duo Clipse 
"Lord Willing", song by Manchild
"Good Lord Willing", song by Little Big Town from A Place to Land
"If the Good Lord's Willing and the Creek Don't Rise", song by Jerry Reed, sung by Johnny Cash
"Amukiriki (The Lord Willing)", single by Les Paul & Mary Ford (1955)

See also
God willing (disambiguation)
Deo volente
Inshallah